Anne Lamy Mook (born November 24, 1947) is an American politician who served in the Vermont House of Representatives from 2005 to 2015. A Democrat, she defeated incumbent representative Albert Krawczyk, who had switched over to the Republican Party, in 2004 and in a rematch in 2006. She did not seek reelection in 2014.

Electoral history

References

External links
Profile at Vote Smart

1947 births
Living people
People from Bennington, Vermont
Politicians from Northampton, Massachusetts
Democratic Party members of the Vermont House of Representatives
University of Hartford alumni
Women state legislators in Vermont
21st-century American politicians
21st-century American women politicians